The 2007 Austin Wranglers season was the 4th season for the franchise. The team finished eighth in the conference and did not make the playoffs.

Schedule

Coaching
Brian Partlow started his first season as head coach of the Wranglers, replacing Skip Foster.

Personnel moves

Acquired

Departures

2007 roster

Stats

Offense

Quarterback

Running backs

Wide receivers

Touchdowns

Defense

Special teams

Kick return

Kicking

Regular season

Week 1: vs Las Vegas Gladiators
at Frank Erwin Center, Austin, Texas

Scoring summary:

1st Quarter:

2nd Quarter:

3rd Quarter:

4th Quarter:

Week 2: at Georgia Force
at Philips Arena, Atlanta

Scoring summary:

1st Quarter:

2nd Quarter:

3rd Quarter:

4th Quarter:

Week 3: at Orlando Predators
at Amway Arena, Orlando, Florida

Scoring summary:

1st Quarter:

2nd Quarter:

3rd Quarter:

4th Quarter:

Week 4: vs Nashville Kats
at Frank Erwin Center, Austin, Texas

Scoring summary:

1st Quarter:

2nd Quarter:

3rd Quarter:

4th Quarter:

Week 5: at Dallas Desperados
at American Airlines Center, Dallas, Texas

Scoring summary:

1st Quarter:

2nd Quarter:

3rd Quarter:

4th Quarter:

Week 6: vs Utah Blaze
at Frank Erwin Center, Austin, Texas

Scoring summary:

1st Quarter:

2nd Quarter:

3rd Quarter:

4th Quarter:

Week 7: at Columbus Destroyers
at Nationwide Arena, Columbus, Ohio

Scoring summary:

1st Quarter:

2nd Quarter:

3rd Quarter:

4th Quarter:

Week 8: vs New Orleans VooDoo
at Frank Erwin Center, Austin, Texas

Scoring summary:

1st Quarter:

2nd Quarter:

3rd Quarter:

4th Quarter:

Week 10: vs Tampa Bay Storm
at Frank Erwin Center, Austin, Texas

Scoring summary:

1st Quarter:

2nd Quarter:

3rd Quarter:

4th Quarter:

Week 11: at Arizona Rattlers
at US Airways Center, Phoenix, Arizona

Scoring summary:

1st Quarter:

2nd Quarter:

3rd Quarter:

4th Quarter:

Week 12: vs Orlando Predators
at Frank Erwin Center, Austin, Texas

Scoring summary:

1st Quarter:

2nd Quarter:

3rd Quarter:

4th Quarter:

Week 13: vs Philadelphia Soul
at Frank Erwin Center, Austin, Texas

Scoring summary:

1st Quarter:

2nd Quarter:

3rd Quarter:

4th Quarter:

Week 14: at New York Dragons
at the Nassau Coliseum, Uniondale, New York

Scoring summary:

1st Quarter:

2nd Quarter:

3rd Quarter:

4th Quarter:

Week 15: vs Georgia Force
at Frank Erwin Center, Austin, Texas

Scoring summary:

1st Quarter:

2nd Quarter:

3rd Quarter:

4th Quarter:

Week 16: at New Orleans VooDoo
at New Orleans Arena, New Orleans

Scoring summary:

1st Quarter:

2nd Quarter:

3rd Quarter:

4th Quarter:

Week 17: at Tampa Bay Storm
at the St. Pete Times Forum, Tampa, Florida

Scoring summary:

1st Quarter:

2nd Quarter:

3rd Quarter:

4th Quarter:

Austin Wranglers
Austin Wranglers seasons
2007 in sports in Texas